Magyar Suzuki Corporation is an automobile manufacturing plant, subsidiary of Suzuki, located in Esztergom, Hungary and founded in 1991 with investments from Suzuki Japan, the Hungarian Government, Itochu and the World Bank. 

History
Through the end of September 2005, the plant had a cumulative production volume of 849,000 vehicles: 465,000 Suzuki Swift (second generation) through March 2003, 187,000 Suzuki Wagon R+,  137,000 Suzuki Ignis and 60,000 Suzuki Swift (first generation). In addition to the Suzuki-badged vehicles, the Hungarian plant also produced 24,943 Fiat Sedici CUVs and 4,494 Ignis-based Subaru G3X Justys. Current production capacity is 300,000 units/year. The plant also produced the Suzuki Splash, as well as a rebadged version, the Opel Agila.

Constructed with an investment of 14 billion Hungarian forints, the plant initially produced 1.0-litre and 1.3-litre Suzuki Swifts, reaching the ten thousandth car in 1993. On 6 October 2006, the plant produced its one millionth car, a five-door second generation Suzuki Swift.

The plant meets ISO 14001 quality levels, engines manufactured at the plant meet Euro 4 requirements, and Suzuki requires ISO 9001:2000 quality assurance certification from suppliers and dealerships. Magyar Suzuki's VIN identifier (the first three digits of the chassis number) is TSM.

Current production
Suzuki SX4 S-Cross (2013–present)
Suzuki Vitara (2015–present)

Former production
Suzuki Swift (1992–2003) – The first generation model, based on the Suzuki Cultus. It was also badged as the Subaru Justy.
Suzuki Wagon R+ (2000–2007) – A rebadged version was produced in Poland, as the Opel Agila.
Suzuki Ignis (2003–2008) – Also badged as the Subaru G3X Justy.
Suzuki Swift (2005–2010) – The second generation model.
Suzuki SX4 (2006–2014) – Also badged as the Fiat Sedici.
Suzuki Splash (2008–2014) – Also badged as the Opel Agila.
Suzuki Swift (2010–2016) – The third generation model.

References

External links
Official website

Suzuki
Buildings and structures in Esztergom
Motor vehicle assembly plants in Hungary